These are the official results of the Men's 400 metres event at the 2003 IAAF World Championships in Paris, France. There were a total number of 51 participating athletes, with seven qualifying heats, three semi-finals and the final held on Tuesday 26 August 2003 at 21:50h.

The gold medal was originally won by Jerome Young of the United States in 44.50, but he was later disqualified for doping, together with his teammate Calvin Harrison who finished sixth.

Final

Semi-final
Held on Sunday 24 August 2003

Heats
Held on Saturday 23 August 2003

See also
Athletics at the 2003 Pan American Games - Men's 400 metres

References
 

H
400 metres at the World Athletics Championships